Fort Henry on the Missouri River, located at the mouth of the Yellowstone where it enters the Missouri, was established on October 1, 1822 by a party of men led by  Major Andrew Henry, who mounted the expedition for the purpose of establishing a fur trade outpost for an area which now encompasses most of Montana, western North Dakota, parts of Wyoming, into Canada.

Other short-lived forts were established by Henry on his earlier expedition with the Missouri Fur Company. In the spring of 1810, the first Fort Henry was built at the Three Forks of the Missouri River near-present day Three Forks, Montana, but was abandoned shortly thereafter.  A second Fort Henry was established during the fall of 1810 on Henry's Fork of the Snake River in present-day southeastern Idaho; it was abandoned in 1811.

References

Henry
Fur trade
Landmarks in North Dakota
History of United States expansionism
Archaeological sites in North Dakota
Pre-statehood history of North Dakota
Forts along the Missouri River